Parauna zikani is a species of beetle in the family Cerambycidae, and the only species in the genus Parauna. It was described by Lane in 1972.

References

Hemilophini
Beetles described in 1972